Jamaica Film Unit (1951 - 1961) was a division of the Britain's Colonial Film Unit to produce educational and propaganda films in  Jamaica. It was headed by Martin Rennalls. The unit had a mobile cinema for showing in rural areas. The unit produced 41 films in Jamaica that preserve archival footage of historical events, interviews, music, dance, and other cultural activities. Non-professional actors had roles in the films.

Filmography
Farmer Brown Learns Good Dairying (1951)
Churchill Visits Jamaica (1953)
It Can Happen to You (1956), about venereal disease
Land We Love (1960)

See also
Jamaica Information Service

References

1951 establishments in the British Empire